Hapoel Tel Aviv is  a sports club in Israel, founded in the 1920s, and part of the Hapoel association. It runs several sports clubs and teams in Tel Aviv which have competed in a variety of sports over the years, such as football, basketball, weightlifting and others. Hapoel Tel Aviv is well known for its red uniforms.

Notable members
Michael Beilin (born 1976), Olympic Greco-Roman wrestler
 Vered "Vardush" Buskila (born 1983), Olympic sailor
 Gil Cohen (born 1992), Olympic sailor
 Maayan Davidovich (born 1988), Olympic windsurfer
Anat Fabrikant (born 1975), Olympic competitive sailor
 Yehoshua Feigenbaum (born 1947), Olympic football player 
 Udi Gal (born 1979), Olympic sailor and world championship bronze medalist
Max Geller (born 1971), Olympic wrestler
Eliezer Halfin (1948–72) Olympic wrestler; killed in Munich Massacre
Michal Hein (born 1968), Olympic windsurfer
Gideon Kliger (born 1980), Olympic sailor and world championship bronze medalist
Mark Slavin (1954–72), Olympic Greco-Roman wrestler; killed in Munich Massacre
 Nik Zagranitchni (born 1969), Olympic wrestler

Notable coaches
Moshe Weinberg (1939–72), wrestling coach; killed in the Munich Massacre

Teams
Hapoel Tel Aviv F.C. – football
Hapoel Tel Aviv B.C. – basketball
Hapoel Tel Aviv (handball) – handball
Hapoel Tel Aviv W. – weightlifting

References

 
Sport in Tel Aviv
Multi-sport clubs in Israel